Lake Chad is a small lake lying east of the mouth of Suess Glacier in the Taylor Valley of Victoria Land. It was charted by the British Antarctic Expedition, 1910–13, under Robert Falcon Scott, and named by them after Lake Chad in Africa. A probable urban myth claims that the lake was named by Scott and his expedition after a brand of toilet paper they used following getting sick from drinking the water.

References

 

Lakes of Victoria Land
McMurdo Dry Valleys